B1, formerly Bo1 is a Swedish second class passenger car built by Kalmar Verkstad. The carriage belongs to the 1960s-cars family and was primarily used by the Swedish state railways, SJ between 1960 and 2006. The type remains in service in Sweden with private operators, including TÅGAB and Snälltåget. A total of 8 carriages remain in service in Sweden. Some carriages were sold to the Croatian state railways after their retirement from the SJ fleet.

Versions

References
 B1 på jarnvag.net
Svenska Person- och Motorvagnar 1999, SJK Skriftserie nr. 69, Stockholm 1999 

Rolling stock of Sweden
Passenger railroad cars